Forever is the posthumous second studio album by American rapper Phife Dawg. It was released on March 22, 2022, the sixth anniversary of his death, by Smokin' Needles Records and AWAL. It features guest appearances by his bandmate Q-Tip, Busta Rhymes, Maseo and Posdnuos of De La Soul, Dwele, Angela Winbush, Redman, Illa J, and Little Brother, among others. The album was mostly complete at the time of Phife Dawg's death, and was later completed by his business partner and collaborator, DJ Rasta Root.

Forever was met with generally positive reviews. At Metacritic, which assigns a normalized rating out of 100 to reviews from professional publications, the album received an average score of 77, based on seven reviews.

Background
Before his death on March 22, 2016, Phife Dawg had spent roughly a decade recording tracks for his second album, originally titled Songs in the Key of Phife: Volume 1 (Cheryl's Big Son). According to DJ Rasta Root, two-thirds of the album was recorded before he stepped in to complete it. For the final third of the album, he used "a lot of blueprints and clues" that Phife Dawg had left behind, in the form of rap notebooks that detailed producers, featured guests, and liner notes that he wanted for the album. DJ Rasta Root noted, "Down to the mix engineer [Bob Power], the photographers, everybody involved had some connection with Phife." His bandmate Ali Shaheed Muhammad mixed two tracks, "Nutshell Pt. 2" and "French Kiss Trois".

Promotion
Forever was promoted with three singles, "Nutshell Pt. 2", "French Kiss Trois", and the title track "Forever". Music videos were released for "Nutshell Pt. 2" on March 22, 2021, "French Kiss Trois" on September 3, 2021, and "Forever" on March 31, 2022.

Track listing
Credits are adapted from Tidal.

Sample credits
 "2 Live Forever" contains a sample of "On Love", performed by David T. Walker.
 "Forever" contains samples of "Triumph", performed by Wu-Tang Clan and "Ms. Jackson", performed by Outkast.

References

2022 albums
AWAL albums
Albums produced by 9th Wonder
Albums produced by Angela Winbush
Albums produced by J Dilla
Albums produced by Khrysis
Albums produced by Nottz
Albums published posthumously
Phife Dawg albums